Leon Lurje Trophy is an international synchronized skating event for the youth held in Gothenburg, Sweden every year. The competition is named after Leon Lurje, a Belarus born Swedish synchronized skater.

References

Figure skating
Sports competitions in Gothenburg